Akhari is an area in Varanasi in the Indian state of Uttar Pradesh. It is about 332 kilometers from the state capital Lucknow and 792 kilometers from the national capital Delhi.

Demography
Akhari has a total population of 4,105 people amongst 670 families. Sex ratio of Akhari is 914 and child sex ratio is 805. Uttar Pradesh state average for both ratios is 912 and 902 respectively.

Transportation
Akhari can be accessed by road and by Indian Railways. Closest railway station to Akhari is Bhulanpur (5 km).  Nearest operational airports are Varanasi airport (37 kilometers) and Allahabad Airports (131 kilometres).

See also

References

Villages in Varanasi district